The Affenpinscher, also known as the Monkey Terrier, is a small-sized terrier-like toy Pinscher breed of dog that originated in Germany. With a distinctive appearance and charming personality, the Affenpinscher has gained popularity among dog lovers worldwide.

History

The breed is German in origin and dates back to the seventeenth century. The name "affenpinscher" is derived from the German Affe (ape, monkey). When translated in English, the name means monkey terrier, supposedly so called because the breed's little face looks more than a little simian. The breed predates and is ancestral to the Griffon Bruxellois (Brussels Griffon) and Miniature Schnauzer.

White feet and chests were also common. The breed was created to be a ratter, working to remove rodents from kitchens, granaries, and stables.

Banana Joe V Tani Kazari (AKA Joe), a five-year-old Affenpinscher, was named Best in Show at the 2013 Westminster Kennel Club Dog Show in New York City. This win is notable since it is the first time this breed has won Best in Show at Westminster.

Description

Appearance
It has a harsh rough coat when it is not clippered and if clippered it can be softer and fluffier. It has a notable monkey-like expression (Affe means monkey in German). Its coat is shaggier over the head and shoulders forming a mane, with a shorter coat over the back and hind quarters. It is harsh and wiry in texture when properly maintained. The FCI and KC breed standards specifies that the coat must be black, but the AKC also allows grey, silver, red, black and tan, and belge (a mixture of red, brown, black and white hairs); other clubs have their own lists of acceptable colors, with black being the preference. The tail is sometimes docked, but in places like Europe, it is illegal.

Temperament
Affenpinschers have a distinct appearance that some associate with terriers. They are different from terriers, however, in that they are actually part of the "Group 2, Section 1: Pinschers and Schnauzers" in the FCI classification and so often get along with other dogs and pets. They are active, adventurous, curious, and stubborn, but they are also fun-loving and playful. The breed is confident, lively, affectionate towards family members and is also very protective of them. This loyal little dog enjoys being with its family. It needs consistent, firm training since some can be quite difficult to housebreak. This type of dog easily becomes bored, so training should be varied. The affenpinscher has a terrier-like personality.

Affenpinschers are somewhat territorial when it comes to their toys and food, so they are not recommended for homes with very small children.  This dog is mostly quiet, but can become very excited if attacked or threatened, and shows no fear toward any aggressor.

Lifespan
A small sample (N=21) of affenpinschers in a UK survey had a median lifespan of 11.4 years, which is a typical lifespan for a purebred dog, but a bit lower than most breeds of their size. The most common causes of death were old age (24%), urologic (19%), and "combinations" (14%).

The affenpinscher is prone to hip dysplasia. As with many small breeds of dog, they are prone to collapsed trachea and luxating patella. Some are prone to fractures, PDA, open fontanel and respiratory problems in hot weather. Ocular conditions such as cataracts are occasionally reported. An emerging concern is syringomyelia, although the incidence is currently unknown.

Shedding
Affenpinschers often appear on lists of dogs that allegedly do not shed (moult). However, the Affenpinscher females are confirmed to be more prone to seasonal flank alopecia, which seems to affect them during the winter. Every hair in the dog coat grows from a hair follicle, which has a three phase cycle, as do most mammals. These cycles are: anagen, growth of normal hair; catagen, growth slows, and hair shaft thins; telegen, hair growth stops, follicle rests, and old hair falls off—is shed. At the end of the telegen phase, the follicle begins the cycle again. The length of time of the growing and shedding cycle varies by breed, age, and by whether the dog is an inside or outside dog.

Frequent grooming reduces the amount of loose fur in the environment.

See also
 Dogs portal
 List of dog breeds

 Companion Dog Group
 Companion dog
 Toy Group
 Griffon Bruxellois

References

External links

 
 Affenpinscher – Full Breed Profile

Companion dogs
Dog breeds originating in Germany
FCI breeds
Rare dog breeds
Toy dogs